Chalybea penduliflora is a species of plant in the family Melastomataceae. It is endemic to Caquetá, and Huila in Colombia.

References

penduliflora
Endangered plants
Endemic flora of Colombia
Taxonomy articles created by Polbot